First Love (Italian: Primo amore) is a 1941 Italian drama film directed by Carmine Gallone and starring Leonardo Cortese, Vivi Gioi and Luigi Almirante. It was made at the Cinecittà Studios in Rome.

Cast
 Leonardo Cortese as Pietro Redi / Peter Reed  
 Vivi Gioi as Jane Blue  
 Luigi Almirante as Girolamo Redi  
 Valentina Cortese as Nerina Redi  
 Bianca Della Corte as Celeste Redi  
 Clelia Matania as Silvia Redi  
 Osvaldo Valenti as Giovannino Cafiero 
 Giuseppe Porelli as Peppino Percoppo 
 Luigi Cimara as Il maestro Giacomo Asquini  
 Carlo Bressan as Il maestro Gargiulo 
 Guido Celano as Il capitano del "Flavio Gioia" 
 Oreste Fares as Il dottore Lanzara 
 Nicola Maldacea as Don Gennaro Del Pezzo
 Dina Romano as Nannina 
 Gina Ror as Donna Concetta 
 Bella Starace Sainati as Zia Giovanna 
 Giuseppe Varni as L'editore Wolkoff  
 Augusto Marcacci 
 Roberto Semprini

References

Bibliography 
 Nowell-Smith, Geoffrey & Hay, James & Volpi, Gianni. The Companion to Italian Cinema. Cassell, 1996.

External links 
 

1941 films
Italian drama films
1941 drama films
1940s Italian-language films
Films directed by Carmine Gallone
Italian black-and-white films
Films shot at Cinecittà Studios
Films scored by Alessandro Cicognini
1940s Italian films